The Leila St John Award is an annual award presented in the Children's Book Council of Australia Awards by the Victorian branch.  The award was first made in 1999.

The CBCA Victoria Branch established the award in recognition of the Leila St John, a founding member in the branch. St John was very active in the branch activities and appeals.

To see the history of the CBCA and other CBCA Awards, see: List of CBCA Awards

Award category and description

The Leila St John Award is awarded for services to children's literature in Victoria.

List of winners

See also

 List of Australian literary awards

References

External links
 Leila St John Award Guidelines
 CBCA Awards
 Leila St John Award, Children's Book Council of Australia (Vic) Inc.

Children's Book Council of Australia
Australian children's literary awards